Camp Lakebottom is a Canadian animated television series produced by 9 Story Media Group that premiered on Teletoon in Canada on July 4, 2013 and on Disney XD in the United States on July 13, 2013.

Series overview

Episodes

Season 1 (2013–14)

Season 2 (2015–2016)

Season 3 (2017)

References

Camp Lakebottom